Yuriy Ivanovych Romanyuk (born 6 May 1997) is a Ukrainian professional footballer who plays as a midfielder for Metalist Kharkiv.

Career
Romanyuk is a product of the FC Volyn Youth Sportive School System. Then he signed a professional contract with FC Volyn Lutsk in the Ukrainian Premier League.

He made his debut in the Ukrainian Premier League for FC Volyn on 20 March 2016, playing in a match against FC Olimpik Donetsk.

References

External links
 

Living people
1997 births
Ukrainian footballers
Association football midfielders
Ukrainian Premier League players
Ukrainian First League players
FC Volyn Lutsk players
FC Chornomorets Odesa players
SC Dnipro-1 players
FC Rukh Lviv players
FC Ahrobiznes Volochysk players
FC Metalist Kharkiv players
Sportspeople from Volyn Oblast